Ghamandpur is a small village in Uttarakhand, India. The village lies between Dehradun and Rishikesh, 4 km from the Jolly Grant Airport. There is an ancient Shiv temple which is Chandramoleshar manifestation of Lord Shiva.

Geography & ecology

With the mountain ranges of Shivalik Hills as backdrop, the village is surrounded by Reserved Forest which has Asian elephants, monkeys and deers. The whole village is surrounded by an electrical fence to keep the wild animals out of farmland.

Economy

The main occupation is farming. Honey harvesting, sugarcane and wheat are the main crops grown in the village farms. There are popular trees commercial plantations. Rajaji Ka Bagh grows mangoes, sugarcane, lychee and other crops. 

Education

Government Polytechnic at nearby Ranipokhari imparts vocational technical education.

Transport and connectivityRanipokhri tunnel'' (Dehradun-Tehri tunnel), ~27 km long tunnel between Dehradun & Tehri on ~35 km long greenfield alignment is being built in this area, southern end of which begins from Ranipokhri.

See also

 Char Dham Highway

References

Villages in Dehradun district